Conrado Nalé Roxlo (February 15, 1898 – July 2, 1971) was an Argentine writer, journalist and humorist, who was born and died in Buenos Aires. He was an author of poetry, plays, film scripts and pastiches in prose, and also the director of two humor magazines: Don Goyo and Esculapión.

In 1945 he won the National Prize of Theatre for his play El cuervo del arca (The Ark's Raven) and in 1955 he was awarded with the National Prize of Literature for his short story collection Las puertas del purgatorio (The Purgatory Gates).

He also wrote children's literature and the biographies, along with Mabel Mármol, of Alfonsina Storni and Amado Villar.

Argentine dramatists and playwrights
Argentine journalists
Male journalists
20th-century Argentine poets
20th-century Argentine male writers
Argentine male poets
Male screenwriters
1898 births
1971 deaths
People from Buenos Aires
Burials at La Recoleta Cemetery
Male dramatists and playwrights
20th-century dramatists and playwrights
20th-century Argentine screenwriters
20th-century journalists